Antun Rudinski (Serbian Cyrillic: Антун Рудински; also transliterated Anton Rudinski or Anton Rudinsky, 1 October 1937 – 7 October 2017) was a Serbian football player and manager, who played as a forward With Red Star Belgrade he won four national Championships (1956, 1957, 1959, 1960), two Yugoslav Cups (1958, 1959) and Danube Cup (1958). With Partizan he also won national Championship (1963).

He only played one match for the Yugoslavia national team on 2 November 1952 against Egypt in a 5–0 win in Belgrade, aged 15 years 32 days old; hence being the youngest European player ever.

References

External links

1937 births
2017 deaths
Serbian footballers
Yugoslav footballers
Association football forwards
Yugoslavia international footballers
FK Spartak Subotica players
Red Star Belgrade footballers
FK Partizan players
NK Olimpija Ljubljana (1945–2005) players
FC Metz players
FC Viktoria Köln players
FC Winterthur players
Yugoslav First League players
Ligue 2 players
Yugoslav football managers
Serbian football managers
SC Freiburg managers
FC Lugano managers
Sportspeople from Subotica
Croats of Vojvodina
Panachaiki F.C. managers
SV Waldhof Mannheim managers
VfL Osnabrück managers
Offenburger FV managers
Freiburger FC managers
Yugoslav expatriate footballers
Serbian expatriate footballers
Expatriate footballers in France
Expatriate footballers in Germany
Expatriate footballers in Switzerland